Shooter, originally titled as Sukha Kahlon is an Indian Punjabi-language action film directed by Dilsher Singh and Khushpal Singh.

Release 
The film was scheduled to be released on 21 February 2020; however, it was banned in Punjab by Capt. Amarinder Singh, then Chief Minister of Punjab, for allegedly promoting violence. Also, the film was banned in Haryana on 21 August 2021, again for allegedly promoting violence. Banning of the film got divided opinions from Punjabi cinema. It was finally released theatrically on 14 January 2022.

Soundtrack

References

External links
 

Punjabi-language Indian films
2020s Punjabi-language films